Avend (also Romanized as Āvand and Ovand) is a village in Donbaleh Rud-e Shomali Rural District, Dehdez District, Izeh County, Khuzestan Province, Iran. At the 2006 census, its population was 211, in 35 families.

References 

Populated places in Izeh County